The 1865 Connecticut gubernatorial election was held on April 3, 1865, the last such election held during the American Civil War, and the last gubernatorial election in which the Republicans adopted the National Union Party name. It was a rematch of the 1864 Connecticut gubernatorial election. Incumbent governor and National Union nominee William Alfred Buckingham defeated Democratic nominee Origen S. Seymour with 57.48% of the vote. It was the eighth and last of Buckingham's consecutive victories.

General election

Candidates
Major party candidates

William Alfred Buckingham, Republican/National Union
Origen S. Seymour, Democratic

Results

References

1865
Connecticut
Gubernatorial